Henry Huntingford (1787-1867) was an English clergyman and miscellaneous writer.

Life
Born at Warminster, Wiltshire on 19 September 1787, he was the son of the Rev. Thomas Huntingford, master of Warminster school, and a nephew of George Isaac Huntingford He became a scholar of Winchester College in 1802, and matriculated at New College, Oxford, on 16 April 1807, subsequently becoming a Fellow both of New College and (5 April 1814) and of Winchester. He took the degree of B.C.L. on 1 June 1814.

In 1822 he was appointed rector of Hampton Bishop, Herefordshire, and in 1838 a prebendary in Hereford Cathedral. He was also rural dean. He died at Goodrest, Great Malvern, on 2 November 1867.

Works
Huntingford published: 
Pindari Carmina juxta exemplar Heynianum ... et Lexicon Pindaricum ex integro Dammii opere etymologico excerptum, an edition of Pindar, 1814; another edition, 1821. His edition of Christian Tobias Damm's Lexicon Pindaricum was also issued separately in 1814. 
Romanist Conversations; or Dialogues between a Romanist and a Protestant. Published at Geneva in 1713, and translated from the original French of Benedict Pictet, 1826.

He also edited his uncle's Thoughts on the Trinity, 1832.

References

Attribution

1787 births
1867 deaths
19th-century English Anglican priests